Alphons Koechlin (6 April 1821 – 6 February 1893) was a Swiss politician and President of the Swiss Council of States (1874/1875).

External links 

1821 births
1893 deaths
Members of the Council of States (Switzerland)
Presidents of the Council of States (Switzerland)